Imperial is a census-designated place (CDP) in Jefferson County, Missouri, United States. The population was 4,407 at the 2020 census, down from 4,709 in 2010. St. John's Church is a historic parish church located within Imperial.

Geography

Imperial is bordered to the north by Arnold, to the south by Barnhart, and to the east by the Mississippi River, which forms the Illinois state line. The CDP surrounds the city of Kimmswick. Interstate 55 runs through Imperial, with access from Exits 185 (Secondary Route M) and 186 (Main Street). Mastodon State Historic Site is located in Imperial.

Demographics

2010 census
As of the census of 2010, there were 4,709 people, 1,769 households, and 1,297 families living in the CDP. The racial makeup of the CDP was 97.5% White, 0.3% African American, 0.3% Native American, 1.1% Asian, 0.1% from other races, and 0.8% from two or more races. Hispanic or Latino of any race were 1.2% of the population.

There were 1,769 households, of which 36.2% had children under the age of 18 living with them, 58.0% were married couples living together, 9.6% had a female householder with no husband present, 5.7% had a male householder with no wife present, and 26.7% were non-families. 21.3% of all households were made up of individuals, and 6.9% had someone living alone who was 65 years of age or older. The average household size was 2.66 and the average family size was 3.08.

The median age in the CDP was 38 years. 24.8% of residents were under the age of 18; 8.1% were between the ages of 18 and 24; 27.2% were from 25 to 44; 29.3% were from 45 to 64; and 10.6% were 65 years of age or older. The gender makeup of the CDP was 50.9% male and 49.1% female.

2000 census
As of the census of 2000, there were 4,373 people, 1,634 households, and 1,228 families living in the CDP. The racial makeup of the CDP was 97.92% White, 0.14% African American, 0.14% Native American, 0.34% Asian, 0.02% Pacific Islander, 0.11% from other races, and 1.33% from two or more races. Hispanic or Latino of any race were 1.17% of the population.

There were 1,634 households, out of which 38.7% had children under the age of 18 living with them, 59.7% were married couples living together, 10.3% had a female householder with no husband present, and 24.8% were non-families. 20.3% of all households were made up of individuals, and 6.7% had someone living alone who was 65 years of age or older. The average household size was 2.67 and the average family size was 3.06.

In the CDP, the population was spread out, with 27.6% under the age of 18, 8.3% from 18 to 24, 34.1% from 25 to 44, 21.5% from 45 to 64, and 8.5% who were 65 years of age or older. The median age was 34 years. For every 100 females, there were 100.6 males. For every 100 females age 18 and over, there were 93.4 males.

The median income for a household in the CDP was $49,565, and the median income for a family was $58,955. Males had a median income of $39,292 versus $30,191 for females. The per capita income for the CDP was $20,431. About 4.9% of families and 9.8% of the population were below the poverty line, including 13.7% of those under age 18 and 8.9% of those age 65 or over.

Education
Almost all of the Imperial CDP is in the Windsor C-1 School District. A small portion of the CDP and several surrounding areas with Imperial addresses are zoned to the Fox C-6 School District. The Windsor district operates Windsor High School in the CDP. Fox C-6 operates Seckman High School outside of the CDP.

The Windsor district previously ended at the eighth grade. High school students would attend Crystal City High School or Herculaneum High School. The Fox district was originally a K-8 school district, with high school students also having a choice of Crystal City High and Herculaneum High. The Fox district became K-12 when Fox High School was established in 1955.

References

Census-designated places in Jefferson County, Missouri
Census-designated places in Missouri
Missouri populated places on the Mississippi River